Biała Woda  is a village in the administrative district of Gmina Suwałki, within Suwałki County, Podlaskie Voivodeship, in north-eastern Poland.

The village has a population of 260.

References

Villages in Suwałki County